WBC Dynamo Moscow is a Russian women's basketball club playing in the Russian Premier League. Founded in 1923, it was one of the most successful teams in the early stages of the Soviet Championship, winning its first 6 seasons and 5 more titles up to 1958. Dynamo culminated this golden era reaching in 1959 the final of the inaugural edition of the European Cup, which they lost to Slavia Sofia.

Four decades later Dynamo emerged briefly as the leading Russian team, winning four Russian Championships in a row and reaching the Euroleague's Final Four in 2000. While the team gradually declined in subsequent years, in 2007 it won the EuroCup, its first international FIBA trophy.

Personnel and Staff 

 Tatiana Nikolaevna Ovechkina serves as the president of WBC Dynamo Moscow.
 Potapov Andrey Valerievich serves as head coach of the club. 
 Zhigil Vladimir Vladimirovich serves as an assistant coach of the club.

Honours 
 FIBA EuroCup: 2007, 2013, 2014
 USSR Championship: 1937, 1938, 1939, 1940, 1944, 1945, 1948, 1950, 1953, 1957, 1958
 Russian Super League A: 1998, 1999, 2000, 2001

Former players

References

External links
 Official website

basketball
EuroCup Women-winning clubs
Women's basketball teams in Russia
Basketball teams established in 1923
Women in Moscow